Kohatsu (written: 古波津) is a Japanese surname. Notable people with the surname include:

, Japanese footballer

See also
Komatsu (surname)

Japanese-language surnames